Juan Pablo Vargas Campos (born 6 June 1995) is a Costa Rican professional footballer who plays as a defender for Categoría Primera A club Millonarios.

Club career
Vargas came through the academy at Liga Deportiva Alajuelense and was promoted to the main squad by coach Óscar Ramírez on 30 May 2013, along with the other youth Ronald Matarrita and Steve Garita.

Vargas has achieved great form playing for Millonarios and has been called the best defender playing in the Colombian league, with some tongue-in-cheek comparisons with Lionel Messi after an assist in a 4–1 win against Cortuluá. Vargas played as Millionarios reached the final of the Copa Colombia in September 2022.

International career
Vargas made his senior Costa Rica debut at the 2017 Copa Centroamericana, playing in a 3–0 win over Belize on January 15, 2017. He scored his first goal for the national team in a 2022 FIFA World Cup qualification match against the United States, netting the opener in a 2–0 victory on March 30, 2022. In November 2022, Vargas was named to Costa Rica's squad for the 2022 FIFA World Cup.

Honours
Millonarios
Copa Colombia: 2022

References

1995 births
Living people
Costa Rican footballers
Costa Rica international footballers
People from Sarchí (canton)
L.D. Alajuelense footballers
Millonarios F.C. players
Deportes Tolima footballers
Association football defenders
Belén F.C. players
2017 CONCACAF Gold Cup players
2022 FIFA World Cup players